Wakes Colne is a village in Essex, England which sits on the River Colne. It is situated next to the village of Chappel, with which it shares Chappel and Wakes Colne railway station.

Location 
It is within the Harwich and North Essex constituency.

Amenities 
The village is relatively small but it does however have several amenities: most of which are shared with Chappel. These include:

 A public house (Swan Inn Chappel)
 A CofE primary school (Chappel Primary)
 Chappel and Wakes Colne railway station
 A small corner shop

History 
While it is unclear when the area was first occupied, in 1086 it was recorded as having 25 residents and there is evidence of Roman settlement in the nearby area dating from a much earlier time period. The parish spent most of its history consisting of two main areas, separated by parts of Mount Bures and Chappel parishes, and four smaller detached areas, three in Chappel and one in White Colne which dated from the 16th century or earlier. Because of the divided parishes act (1882) 118 acres were transferred to Wakes Colne from neighbouring parishes and six to the adjacent parish of Chappel.

References

External links 

 Wakes Colne Parish Council
 British History Online: History of Wakes Colne
 East Anglian Railway Museum

Villages in Essex
Borough of Colchester